Alta Gracia is a popular slow song by Surinamese-born Dutch singer  Oscar Harris.  It was released in Turkey, Mexico and Netherlands as a 45 rpm record in 1974. The reverse side of the record is I'll Take Good Care of You.

References

1976 singles
1976 songs
Dutch singers